Northern Kabuntalan, officially the Municipality of Northern Kabuntalan (Maguindanaon: Ingud nu Northern Kabuntalan; Iranun: Inged a Northern Kabuntalan), is a 5th class municipality in the province of Maguindanao del Norte, Philippines. According to the 2020 census, it has a population of 26,277 people.

During the second regular session of the first legislative assembly of the Autonomous Region in Muslim Mindanao, the regional legislature created Northern Kabuntalan out of 11 barangays of Kabuntalan, by virtue of Muslim Mindanao Autonomy Act No. 206, which was subsequently ratified in a plebiscite held on December 30, 2006. The town was part of the province of Shariff Kabunsuan until its nullification by the Supreme Court in July 2008.

The ARMM law creating the municipality provides that its administrative center shall be established in barangay Tumaguinting.

Geography

Barangays
Northern Kabuntalan is politically subdivided into 11 barangays.

Balong
Damatog (Poblacion)
Gayonga
Guiawa
Indatuan
Kapimpilan
Libungan
Montay
Paulino Labio
Sabaken
Tumaguinting

Climate

Demographics

Economy

References

External links
 Northern Kabuntalan Profile at the DTI Cities and Municipalities Competitive Index
 MMA Act No. 205 : An Act Creating the Municipality of Northern Kabuntalan in the Province of Maguindanao
 Newly created provinces, municipalities, barangays, converted city Accessed on March 9, 2006.
 [ Philippine Standard Geographic Code]
 Philippine Census Information
 Local Governance Performance Management System

Municipalities of Maguindanao del Norte
Populated places on the Rio Grande de Mindanao